MultiCam is a camouflage pattern designed for use in a wide range of environments and conditions which was specifically developed and is produced by American company Crye Precision. As a result of the pattern's effectiveness across disparate environments and regions, it has found extensive adoption globally. Variants of it, some unlicensed, are in use with armed forces worldwide, particularly with special operations units.

The pattern is also available for purchase for civilian usage. Derived from the original standard pattern, additional specified variants were developed and later introduced, those are "Arid", "Tropic", "Alpine" and "Black".

History

First unveiled and designed in 2002, MultiCam was designed for the use of the U.S. Army in varied environments, seasons, elevations, and light conditions. It is a seven-color, multi-environment camouflage pattern developed by Crye Precision in conjunction with United States Army Soldier Systems Center.

The pattern was included in the U.S. Army's move to replace the 3-Color Desert and Woodland patterns, but in 2004 lost to the Universal Camouflage Pattern (UCP) that came to be used in the Army Combat Uniform. Nonetheless, it remained in limited use by the U.S. Army special forces in the mid-to-late 2000s in Iraq and Afghanistan. MultiCam was also continually trialed for its "Future Force Warrior" program demonstrations.

MultiCam was officially re-commissioned by the U.S. Army in 2010, replacing UCP for units deploying to fight in the War in Afghanistan, under the designation Operation Enduring Freedom Camouflage Pattern (OEF-CP). It had already been used by some American special operations units and civilian law enforcement agencies. The U.S. Army discontinued the use of UCP in October 2019.

MultiCam is available for commercial sale to civilians.

A version of MultiCam has been adopted by the armed forces of the United Kingdom as the Multi-Terrain Pattern (MTP), replacing their previous DPM camouflage. MTP retains the color palette of MultiCam but incorporates shapes similar to the previous DPM scheme. After using the MultiCam scheme in Afghanistan, Australia has also adopted its own version, combining the pattern of MultiCam with the color palette of its earlier DPCU / Auscam pattern.

On 25 November 2013, Crye Precision unveiled a family of MultiCam variants, which they can reduce the visual and near-IR signature of a person operating in different environments. There are four variants from the original MultiCam. First is arid, for users operating in desert environments. Second is tropic, for users operating in dense jungle environments and areas that predominantly consist of lush vegetation that remains relatively unaffected by seasonal changes. Third is alpine, for users operating in snow-covered environments and intended to be used in every area of operation that receives significant snowfall. Last is black that meets the unique requirements of police tactical units operating in high-risk environments and projects a distinctly authoritative presence appropriate for domestic operations.

Appearance

MultiCam has a background of a brown to light tan gradient, overprinted with a dark green, olive green, and lime green gradient and a top layer of opaque dark brown and cream-colored shapes spread throughout the pattern. This allows for the overall appearance to change from predominantly green to predominantly brown in different areas of the fabric, while having smaller shapes to break up the larger background areas.

The MultiCam color scheme in hex triplet is as follows:(i) Cream 524 B8A78B; (ii) Dark Brown 530 48352F; (iii) Tan 525 967860; (iv) Brown 529 6F573F; (v) Dark Green 528 5A613F; (vi) Olive 527 8C7D50; and (vii) Pale Green 526 85755C.

Variants

Australia

Army

On 19 November 2010, after trials by Australian special operations forces, the Australian Defence Force announced that MultiCam will be standard for all regular Australian Army personnel in Afghanistan. MultiCam, it is said, provided "... troops with greater levels of concealment across the range of terrains in Afghanistan – urban, desert and green." Previously, depending upon the terrain, Australian troops had to transition between green and desert colored Australian Disruptive Pattern Camouflage Uniforms (DPCU or AUSCAM). On 30 May 2011 the Defence Material Organisation announced that they had obtained licence to produce MultiCam in Australia for US$4.7 million and Crye would also design a new uniquely Australian pattern for another US$3.1 million.

The Australian Army decided to standardize MultiCam-patterned uniforms starting in October 2014 called the Australian Multicam Camouflage Uniform (AMCU). The Australian derivative retains colour and pattern elements of the previous DPCU pattern. The AMCU is manufactured domestically by Australian Defence Apparel and Pacific Brands Workwear Group and comes in two variations, field and combat, using a tested Australian Multi-Camouflage Pattern that can operate in bush, desert, and jungle conditions. Previous DPCU Uniforms and Australian MultiCam Pattern Operational Combat Uniforms will be worn until all Army personnel have been issued with the AMCU.

Air Force

In 2014 the Royal Australian Air Force began fielding a new MultiCam-based uniform to replace the DPCU, called the General Purpose Uniform (GPU), using the blue-and-grey colours of the RAAF. The uniform is not intended to be used as camouflage in warlike operations or environments.

Navy

In 2015, the Royal Australian Navy began their own testing of a new MultiCam uniform with a blue colourway, calling it the Maritime Multicam Pattern Uniform (MMPU) The new uniform and pattern was intended to replace the Navy's grey-and-green Disruptive Pattern Navy Uniform (DPNU) by 2017. In 2019, the Navy announced that it was fielding a variant of the new AMCU including the design and cut of the uniform itself, and reverting to the grey-and-green colours of the DPNU.

The fabric for the AMCU, MMPU, and GPU are produced in Australia by Bruck Textiles Pty Ltd.

Georgia

A domestic variant of MultiCam is in use with the Georgian Defense Forces as standard issue for all military branches as well as special units of the MIA and State Security. The pattern was adopted somewhere in 2010 replacing the DWC and MARPAT and since has been produced in a slightly altered version that fits better to the local environment.

Hungary

New Zealand

The New Zealand Defence Force announced in late 2019 that it would be replacing its local Multi Terrain Pattern camouflage (NZMTP), in use since 2014, with a variant of British Multi-Terrain Pattern. The rollout began in 2020. Prior to this New Zealand Special Forces in Afghanistan wore uniforms in Crye Precision MultiCam.

Poland
A modified version of MultiCam has been adopted by the some of Polish Special Forces. It is named Suez.

Portugal
As part of the Sistemas de Combate do Soldado (Soldiers Combat Systems) project, in 2018, the Portuguese Army started to experiment a new individual equipment system for the dismounted soldiers, which includes a new camouflaged MultiCam-style uniform. This new uniform was tested in the field by units deployed to the Central African Republic, Afghanistan and Iraq. In 2019, the MultiCam-style camouflaged was officially adopted as the Multiterreno (Multi-terrain), becoming the standard field uniform camouflage of the Portuguese Army, gradually replacing the Disruptive Pattern Material pattern. It was developed in cooperation with the CINAMIL (Research Center for Development and Innovation of the Military Academy.

Russia
MultiCam has also been adopted by some Russian Spetsnaz units, including FSB Alpha, the SSO, and by the Internal Troops of the MVD. It's reported that Russia makes their own MultiCam camos.

Ukraine 
The first use of MultiCam in Ukraine was done by the "Ukrainian Volunteer Battalions": militias and paramilitary groups formed to fight separatists, which were largely self-funded and bought their own equipment.

Ukraine first adopted MultiCam officially for their special forces units as part of a larger NATO training and modernization program, together with a new digital camo for regular units. However, some regular Ukrainian Armed Forces and the National Guard of Ukraine units have been issued MultiCam uniforms as well. Territorial Defense Forces volunteers, are sometimes issued or buy their own MultiCam uniforms. Members of the special police unit Rapid Operational Response Unit (KORD) of the National Police of Ukraine also use MultiCam.

United Kingdom
The colors of the MultiCam pattern were also used in the development of the British armed forces Multi-Terrain Pattern (MTP). British forces deployed in Afghanistan used MTP uniforms from March 2010 onwards, with these uniforms replacing all Disruptive Pattern Material (DPM) uniforms by 2013. The colors used in Crye's MultiCam technology were determined to be the best performing, across the widest range of environments (by a significant margin) when compared with the two existing DPM designs in use at the time and was subsequently selected as the basis for the new MTP camouflage, combined with the existing DPM base pattern. In June 2020, the Royal Marines announced the adoption of a new uniform made by Crye which uses the original MultiCam pattern instead of MTP, though the compatibility of the two designs means that items of load carrying equipment produced in MTP continue to be on issue; prior to this, usage of original MultiCam as an issued uniform (as opposed to items privately purchased by individual personnel) was limited to United Kingdom Special Forces units.

United States

MultiCam is currently in use by the U.S. Special Operations Command, and some private military contractors. Several members of the U.S. Army's Charlie Company, 2nd Battalion, 12th Infantry Regiment were also seen wearing MultiCam when followed by ABC News. In 2010, U.S. soldiers deployed to Afghanistan were issued MultiCam versions of the Army Combat Uniform, as the existing Universal Camouflage Pattern (UCP) was found to be inadequate for the terrain.

In May 2014, the Army selected a pattern similar to MultiCam called Scorpion W2 to replace UCP, naming it the Operational Camouflage Pattern (OCP). The original Scorpion pattern was jointly developed by Crye Precision and the Army for the Objective Force Warrior program in 2002, and Crye made small adjustments for trademark purposes to create MultiCam. Because Scorpion is similar to MultiCam, the same color Velcro, buttons, and zippers can be reused. OCP resembles MultiCam with muted greens, light beige, and dark brown colors, but uses fewer beige and brown patches and no vertical twig and branch elements. On 31 July 2014, the Army formally announced that OCP would begin being issued in uniforms in summer 2015. Soldiers were allowed to continue wearing uniforms and field equipment patterned in MultiCam until they could acquire OCP, which was allowed until the MultiCam uniforms' wear-out date on 1 October 2018. The U.S. Air Force also subsequently adopted OCP uniforms, starting 2018 with full phase-in April 1, 2021 replacing the previous Airman Battle Uniform.

Some local, state and federal law enforcement agencies also make use of the pattern, including the Drug Enforcement Administration's Foreign-deployed Advisory and Support Teams (FAST) teams operating in Afghanistan as well as the U.S. Immigration and Customs Enforcement's Special Reaction Team,  the Spokane, Washington Police Department, and the Oregon State Police SWAT team.

Users

Current
 : Used by parachute units of Special Operation Brigade of the Angolan Army.
 : adopted a variation used by armed forces (Argentine Army., Argentine Air Force, Argentina Marines.) and security forces.
 : Used by Armenian Special Forces and the National Security Service.
 : 
MultiCam: Currently used by Special Operations Command and Police Tactical Groups.
Australian Multicam Camouflage Uniform (derived from MultiCam): Adopted by the Australian Defence Force for general issue from 2014 onwards, replacing the Disruptive Pattern Camouflage Uniform and the Australian MultiCam Pattern Operational Combat Uniform patterns.
 : Austrian Special Forces (Jagdkommando) and Austrian troops deployed to Afghanistan
 : Used by the Comando de Operações Táticas of the Federal Police of Brazil.
 : Seen in use by Canadian Special Operations Forces Command
 : MultiCam is the standard issue uniform of the Marine Corps and the Navy Special Warfare Division. Also used by the Chilean Air Force Commandos
 : Main combat uniform of the Cypriot National Guard army brunch.
 : Standard uniform of the Danish military
 : In use by Egyptian Navy Special Forces.
 : In use by Estonian Special Operations Force.
 : Used by the Special Operations Command's units.
  Seen in use with some members of the Coastal Jaeger Battalion and the Special Jaeger Battalion.
 : Standard uniform of the Defense Forces, modified variant produced locally. Issued also to law enforcement and security agencies.
 : Used by certain units of the Haitian National Police.
 : Used by Hong Kong Police Force, Special Duties Unit
 : Used by MARCOS commandos, Garud Commando Force and Paras in jungle operations.
 : A Variant of Multicam based on US Army OCP with local DPM color palette Used by Indonesian Army known as Loreng Angkatan Darat. A Desert/Arid variant intended to replace the older local Desert DPM Variant are also Present.
 : Used by Jordanian special forces units as the M2015 JSOC pattern.
 : Operational Camouflage Pattern (based on MultiCam predecessor), Standard issued uniform for all branches replaced U.S. Woodland on 21 November 2017.
 : Replacing the woodland pattern with Mutlticam uniforms from Crye for the Maltese military.
 : Standard uniform of the Montenegro military. Made by YDS Textiles with a Montenegrin motif in the camo print.
 : Korps Commandotroepen (KCT) and the Netherlands Marine Corps used it on tour in Afghanistan. The Dutch-made MultiCam camo is made by NFM Group.
 : New Zealand Special Air Service, New Zealand Army, Royal New Zealand Air Force, For use by the Special Operations Forces (NZSOF) in Afghanistan and Iraq.
 : First seen during a parade in October 2020, used by select units.
 : Forsvarets Spesialkommando (FSK) - Special Operations Command and Marinejegerkommandoen (MJK) - Naval Special Operations Command use multicam. 
 : Crye Precision and commercial clone copies used by numerous Special Forces units in the Armed Forces of the Philippines. 
 : Polish Jednostka Wojskowa GROM, Agencja Bezpieczeństwa Wewnętrznego, Biuro Ochrony Rządu and Jednostka Wojskowa Komandosów units uses "Suez", a slightly modified MultiCam pattern.
 : Used by Portuguese Armed Forces (Portuguese Paratroopers, Commandos, Special Operations Troops Centre, NOTP and Special Actions Detachment).
 : UF-Pro-made MultiCam uniforms used by Romanian special forces.
 : Russia's FSB Alpha Group and Vympel and the MVD's SOBR Group. Russian Special Forces in Syria were also seen using MultiCams. Zaslon forces use them on occasions when needed.
 : Used by the RS' Special Anti-Terrorist Unit.
 : Used by Special Operations Force and Naval Diving Unit of the Singapore Armed Forces and also by the STAR unit and Gurkha Contingent of the Singapore Police Force.
 : South Korean UDT/SEAL operators.
 : Spanish Army's Special Operations Group and Special Naval Warfare Force personnel.
 : Used by the SOG and special forces support units as well as UH-60M crew members. 
 : Combat Control Team Special Operation Regiment Royal Thai Air Force, Royal Thai Armed Forces Headquarters's Counter Terrorist Operations Center.
 :Seen used by USGN in Raoued operation.
 : Used by some units within the Turkish Special Forces.
 : Used by various Ukrainian special forces units. Some regular Ukrainian military and National Guard units were also seen wearing MultiCam. Territorial Defense Forces volunteers are sometimes issued or buy their own MultiCam uniforms.
 :
 MultiCam: Seen in use by United Kingdom Special Forces personnel.
 Used by Royal Marines to replace MTP.
 Multi-Terrain Pattern (MultiCam coloration but not pattern):British Army and Royal Air Force from 2011 onwards.
 :
 MultiCam: U.S. Army, U.S. Navy EOD, United States Special Operations Command, and U.S. Air Force.
 Hostage Rescue Team
 Operational Camouflage Pattern (based on MultiCam predecessor): Adopted by the US Army, Air Force, and Space Force as standard issue.
 : Uzbek-made version used by the Uzbek military.
 : Adopted Multicam-based designs in 2020. They consist of Trópico multicámara (Tropical Multicam) and the Negro multicámara (Black Multicam) under the El Uniforme Patriota Tiuna Camuflado (Tiuna Patriot Camouflage Uniform).

Future
 : At the end of 2022, all components of the Belgian Armed Forces will start adopting MultiCam as standard issue, except for the Naval Component.
 : A French-developed camouflage inspired by MultiCam, called Bariolage Multi-Environnement (BME), is due to become the standard camouflage pattern of the French Armed Forces from 2024 onwards.

Former
 : Worn by Afghan National Army commandos. Known to be used by operators of Crisis Response Unit 222.
 : An "all-terrain" MultiCam-influenced pattern camouflage that debuted during the 2015 Victory Day Parade. It was intended to replace Type 07 uniform. Ultimately it was not adopted by PLA.

Others

Known to be used by anti-government forces in Syria, including:
  Islamic State of Iraq and Syria
  Al-Nusra Front
  Islamic Front
  Sham Legion
  Turkistan Islamic Party
  Ajnad al-Kavkaz

See also 
 Future Force Warrior
 U.S. Army trial patterns
 MR-C - seen painted with MultiCam
 Soldier Plate Carrier System

References

Bibliography

External links 

 MultiCamPattern.com
 Crye Precision
 United States patent, number US D487,848 S for MultiCam
 Military Morons review and history of MultiCam
 "British Army to get new uniforms – turned down by the US and made in China", The Daily Telegraph, 20 December 2009.
 "British Army to get new camouflage uniform, BBC News, 20 December 2009.
 "Camo Delays and Assessment Team Gouge, DefenseTech 29 December 2009.
 English Translation of Hebrew article on MultiCam
 Multicam & Multi Terrain Pattern (MTP) compared

2002 in military history
United States military uniforms
Camouflage patterns
Military camouflage
Products introduced in 2002
Military equipment introduced in the 2000s